is an EP by Japanese pop band Pizzicato Five, released on November 22, 2000 by Readymade Records.

Track listing

Charts

References

External links
 

2000 EPs
Pizzicato Five EPs
Nippon Columbia albums
2000 Christmas albums
Christmas albums by Japanese artists
Japanese-language EPs